The Columbus Checkers were a minor league professional ice hockey team in the International Hockey League from 1966 to 1970, and the first professional hockey team in Columbus, Ohio.

Their first game was against the Chicago Blackhawks of the National Hockey League on October 12, 1966 at the Ohio Expo Fairgrounds Coliseum.

The team was originally coached by Moe Bartoli, however after the 1967–68 season, Bartoli was involved in a dispute with the teams owners, and left. Jack Turner took over as the team's Head Coach at the start of the 1968 season.

Notably, Alton White, who would become the second player of African decent, after Willie O'Ree, to play on a professional major league ice-hockey team, played for the club over three seasons from 1966 to 1969. He tallied 96 goals and 130 assists for 226 points in 204 games played for the club. He would go on to play 145 games in the WHA for the New York Raiders, Los Angeles Sharks, and Michigan Stags/Baltimore Blades.

The Columbus Checkers became defunct in the spring of 1970 due to low attendance.

Season-by-season results

References

Hockeydb.com Columbus Checkers Statistics

International Hockey League (1945–2001) teams
Sports teams in Columbus, Ohio
Ice hockey teams in Ohio
Defunct ice hockey teams in Ohio
Ice hockey clubs established in 1966
Ice hockey clubs disestablished in 1970
1966 establishments in Ohio
1970 disestablishments in Ohio